Zdeněk Měřínský (16 January 1948 in Jihlava – 9 September 2016 in Panská Lhota) was a Czech archeologist and historian specializing in medieval archaeology, Czech and Austrian medieval history, casteollogy (building and function of castles), evolution of the settlement structure, and topography. The head of the Department of Archaeology and Museology (Faculty of Arts) at the Masaryk University. He also lectured at other universities. The author of several hundred scientific studies, author or co-author of several important monographs.

Selected works
 Morava ve středověku [Moravia in the Middle Ages] (1999)
 České země od příchodu Slovanů po Velkou Moravu I. [The Czech Lands from the Arrival of the Slavs to Great Moravia I.] (2002)
 České země od příchodu Slovanů po Velkou Moravu II. [The Czech Lands from the Arrival of the Slavs to Great Moravia II.] (2006)
 Dějiny Rakouska History of Austria (2006, co-author)
 Morava na úsvitě dějin [Moravia at the Dawn of History] (2011)
 Stěhování národů a východ Evropy [Migration Period and Eastern Europe] (2013, co-author)

References

External links
Profile of Zdeněk Měřínský at the Masaryk University

1948 births
2016 deaths
People from Jihlava
20th-century Czech historians
Czech archaeologists
Czech medievalists
21st-century Czech historians